Fyre Fraud is an American documentary film about the fraudulent Fyre Festival, a 2017 music festival in the Bahamas. Directed by Jenner Furst and Julia Willoughby Nason, it premiered on January 14, 2019, on Hulu.

Premise
Fyre Fraud is described in its press release as a "true-crime comedy bolstered by a cast of whistleblowers, victims, and insiders going beyond the spectacle to uncover the power of FOMO and an ecosystem of enablers, driven by profit and a lack of accountability in the digital age".

Production
On April 16, 2018, it was announced that Hulu was developing a docuseries about the infamous failed 2017 musical festival Fyre Festival. The film was set to be directed by Jenner Furst and Julia Willoughby Nason and executive produced by Michael Gasparro, John Amato, Dana Miller, Angela Freedman, and Sharmi Gandhi. Production companies involved with the film were slated to include  The Cinemart, Mic and Billboard.

On January 14, 2019, Hulu debuted the production, titled Fyre Fraud, in a surprise "rush release" with no promotion, advertising, or press preceding the film's launch. The premiere allowed Hulu to get their project out to audiences four days before Netflix's documentary about the same subject, Fyre: The Greatest Party That Never Happened, was released.

In February 2019, Entertainment One acquired the international rights to Fyre Fraud.

Reception
The film was met with a positive response from critics upon its premiere. On the review aggregation website Rotten Tomatoes, the film holds  approval rating with an average rating of  based on  reviews. The website's critical consensus reads, "In the battle over Fyre Festival content, Fyre Fraud comes out swinging with a questionable interview of conman Billy McFarland and a thoughtful exploration of nefarious social strategy." Metacritic, which uses a weighted average, assigned the series a score of 66 out of 100 based on 12 critics, indicating "generally favorable reviews".

In a positive review, RogerEbert.coms Nick Allen gave the film a rating of 3½ out of 4 stars and praised it saying, "Fyre Fraud does not just dunk on McFarland, Ja Rule, and anyone who might be complicit—they’re clowns already, their plainly not-smart choices and astounding arrogance making for super-size schadenfreude. More persuasively, it's a damnation of the mentality that helped make it possible, calling out a culture that progressively puts more value into how you make yourself look online." In a similarly favorable analysis, Deciders Joel Keller commended the film and recommended that viewers stream it declaring, "Fyre Fraud is a fascinating examination of social media influencers, millennials who get hooked on their feelings of FOMO, and a modern-day con artist who will likely learn nothing from this or his prison sentence."

In a more mixed assessment, Colliders Brian Tallerico gave the film a "B−" grade and said, "With a bit more polish and a bit more confidence, Fyre Fraud would be a powerful documentary that used Fyre Festival as a springboard for a more incisive examination of fraud in the age of social media, using the festival as a metaphor for expectations versus reality, which (as my wife astutely pointed out), is a mirror for how social media tends to function. Instead, Fyre Fraud is content to exist as a dark comedy of sorts, poking fun at the players involved without really absorbing the seriousness or gravity of their actions."

On the 71st Primetime Creative Arts Emmy Awards, Fyre Fraud earned a nomination for Outstanding Writing for Nonfiction Programming.

References

External links
 
 

Hulu original films
American documentary films
Documentary films about music festivals
Films about social media
2019 documentary films
2019 films
2010s English-language films
2010s American films